Przyprostynia  is a village in the administrative district of Gmina Zbąszyń, within Nowy Tomyśl County, Greater Poland Voivodeship, in west-central Poland.

The village has an approximate population of 900.

References

Przyprostynia